Richard Raftus (1845 – September 7, 1879) was a lawyer and politician in Newfoundland. He represented Ferryland in the Newfoundland House of Assembly from 1874 to 1878.

The son of Thomas Raftus and Mary Butler, he was born in St. John's and was educated at St. Bonaventure's College. Raftus studied law with Joseph Ignatius Little and was admitted to the Newfoundland bar in 1871. He married Hannah Powers. Raftus also wrote poetry and acted in local theatre.

He died suddenly at the age of 34 in St. John's.

References 

Members of the Newfoundland and Labrador House of Assembly
1845 births
1879 deaths
Newfoundland Colony people